The spotted sand-diver (Trichonotus setiger) is a perciform fish in the family Trichonotidae. T. setiger is the type species of genus Trichonotus.

Description
They have 39 to 41 soft dorsal spines. Males can be distinguished from females by their long dorsal fin rays and larger size.

Distribution
T. setiger can be found from the Persian Gulf to Queensland and Melanesia

Habits
Spotted sand-divers occur in large groups where there are steep sand slopes. They hover above clean sandy substrates and dive into the sand when disturbed. The habitat usually contains some silt. They are normally observed resting on sea bed, leaving substrate to catch zooplankton, or to display. Some species in the genus Trichonotus are protogynous hermaphrodites.

References

External links
 Trichonotus setiger @ fishesofaustralia.net.au

spotted sand-diver
Marine fish of Southeast Asia
Marine fish of Northern Australia
spotted sand-diver
Taxa named by Marcus Elieser Bloch
Taxa named by Johann Gottlob Theaenus Schneider